Calabro is an Italian surname. Notable people with the surname include:

Frank Calabro (born 1925), politician
Iliana Calabró (born 1966), Argentine actress
Juan Carlos Calabró (1934–2013), Argentine actor and comedian
Kevin Calabro (born 1956), sports announcer
Louis Calabro (1926–1991), composer
Marian Calabro, author
Richard Calabro (born 1979), actor
Sandro Calabro (born 1983), footballer
Thomas Calabro (born 1959), actor and director

Italian-language surnames